The Central Kimberley Football League is an Australian rules football competition in the Kimberley region of Western Australia. 
The league was formed in 1991, and a number of the clubs represent local Aboriginal communities.

Presently there a six clubs in the competition, The league plays triple headers at the Fitzroy Crossing recreation ground, matches usually start at 1pm, 3pm and 5pm.

Current Clubs

Former clubs

Grand final results 

Source:
Records sourced from West Australian Country Football League Annual Reports

2011 season
																		
																		
Finals

2022 season

References

Website
League website

Kimberley (Western Australia)
Australian rules football competitions in Western Australia